Beise may refer to:

Sheldon Beise (1911–1960), American football player and coach
Beise (Fulda), a river of Hesse, Germany, tributary of the Fulda
one of the Royal and noble ranks of the Qing dynasty in China